Star Blanket Cree Nation ( acâhkosa kâ-otakohpit, meaning One who has stars as a blanket)  is a First Nations band government in Saskatchewan, Canada.  Its reserves are in the Fort Qu'Appelle area.  The Star Blanket Cree Nation is one of the bands covered by Treaty 4.

Etymology

The Star Blanket Cree Nation is named for its Chief Ahchacoosacootacoopetis (acâhkosa kâ-otakohpit, "one who has stars for a blanket"), who assumed the position in 1875.

Indian reserves
The band governs 14 reserves:
Star Blanket Indian Reserve No. 83, 18 km northeast of Fort Qu'appelle, 5611.90 ha.
Star Blanket Indian Reserve No. 83-D, 253.10 ha.
Star Blanket Indian Reserve No. 83B, Lot 35 & 36 Block 3 in Town of Fort Qu'Appelle, 0.20 ha.
Star Blanket Indian Reserve No. 83C, 18 km northeast of Lipton, 320 ha.
Star Blanket Indian Reserve No. 83E, 318.50 ha.
Star Blanket Indian Reserve No. 83F, 65.10 ha.
Star Blanket Indian Reserve No. 83G, 128.20 ha.
Star Blanket Indian Reserve No. 83H, 65.10 ha.
Star Blanket Indian Reserve No. 83I, 191.80 ha.
Star Blanket Indian Reserve No. 83J, 260.60 ha.
Star Blanket Indian Reserve No. 83K, 375.40 ha.
Star Blanket Indian Reserve No. 83L, 128.10 ha.
Atim Ka-mihkosit Reserve (ᐊᑎᒼ ᑳ ᒥᐦᑯᓯᐟ, atim kâ-mihkosit), 13.20 ha.
Treaty Four Reserve Grounds Indian Reserve No. 77, adjacent to and west of Fort Qu'appelle, 37.90 ha. (shared with 33 other bands
Wa-Pii Moos-toosis (White Calf) Indian Reserve No. 83A, 22.30 ha.

Chiefs 
Chief Ahchacoosacootacoopetis (acâhkosa kâ-otakohpit, "one who has stars for a blanket"), who assumed the position in 1875.

Chief Michael Starr c. 2019

See also
Balcarres, Saskatchewan (location of their postal address)
Division No. 6, Saskatchewan

References

First Nations governments in Saskatchewan
Cree governments